Kudirkos Naumiestis is in the Šakiai district municipality, Lithuania.

History

The settlement was first mentioned in 1561 as a village called Duoliebaičiai. In 1639 the town was renamed Vladislavovas by Cecilia Renata of Austria after her husband Władysław IV Vasa. He granted the town Magdeburg rights in 1643. However, the name did not achieve popular usage, and the settlement became known as "a town" or "a new town" instead. The German name Neustadt Schirwindt is derived from the former town of Schirwindt, today a small military village called Kutuzovo, which lay just across the border. In 1900 the town began being referred to as Naumiestis (New Town). In 1934 the town was renamed Kudirkos Naumiestis in honor of the Lithuanian patriot and composer of the Lithuanian national anthem, Vincas Kudirka, who lived there from 1895 to his death in 1899 and is buried there.

A well-organized Jewish community also lived in there and produced a number of prominent rabbis and Jewish scholars. Before World War II the town had about 700-800 Jewish residents. Journalist and writer Herman Bernstein was born here in 1876 and Rabbi Abba Hillel Silver, who would become a prominent American Jewish leader, was born here in 1893.

In 1941, an Einsatzgruppen of Germans and Lithuanian collaborators murdered the local Jewish population in mass executions. Hundreds of people were massacred.

Notable people
 Sammy Marks - (Neustadt, 1844–1920), Lithuanian-born industrialist and financier in South Africa. (See Randlord). Born the son of a Jewish tailor.
 Adolph Moses Radin (1848–1909), rabbi
 Pranas Sederevičius (1905-1979), who, from 1951, created concrete sculptures in the garden of his home 'Kudirkos Naumiestis'.
Max Band (1901-1974), artist.

References

External links 

 Jewish Encyclopedia article
 Old Jewish cemetery

 
Cities in Lithuania
Cities in Marijampolė County
Shtetls
Suwałki Governorate
Holocaust locations in Lithuania